William (Bill) Roemer (born August 21, 1956) is a member of the Ohio House of Representatives, since 2019, representing the 31st district. The district encompasses the majority of western and northern Summit county. A Republican, he is serving his third term in the House of Representatives.

In 2010, Roemer ran for Summit County Council at large and was successful.  He served 4 years and then, in 2015 ran for the Summit Educational Services Center Board of Governors winning the election. In 2016, Roemer ran for Summit County Executive, but lost. Two years later when state Representative Marilyn Slaby announced that she would not seek reelection, Roemer announced his candidacy for her state House seat. He would easily win the seat against Democrat Elliott Kolkovich with 58% of the vote.

In 2020, he handily defeated fellow Richfield resident Democrat Joe Campbell 61% to 39% and, in 2022, defeated Rita Darrow 52% to 48%. He serves on the Finance, Commerce and Labor, Financial Institutions, and Ways and Means committees. Additionally, Roemer is the chairman of the Ohio House Health and Human Services sub-committee. During his time in the House, Roemer has had several bills passed into law primarily dealing with healthcare, taxation, and regulatory reform.

In 2022, Roemer passed the Program of All-Inclusive Care for the Elderly (PACE) Act. PACE is a managed care model that provides participants with needed medical care in multiple settings. The PACE Act will expand Medicaid to ensure the elderly can stay in their homes and have more options to save on burdensome costs for their care.  Among his many accomplishments, Roemer was also the primary sponsor of HB 558 allowing for unused prescription drugs to be safely donated by end users to charitable pharmacies and non-profit clinics. This enables Ohioans to cut down on drug waste and improve access to life-saving medications for uninsured and underinsured patients.

Roemer has been on the receiving end of numerous awards and distinctions for his exemplary state service, including: the David C. Rinebolt Community Service Award, Ohio Society of CPAs Outstanding Legislator of the Year Award, LeadingAge Public Service Award, Ohio Association of Area Agencies on Aging's Legislator of the Year Award, and the Akron Cleveland Association of REALTORS' #HomeforAll Award.

A longtime community leader in Summit County, Roemer served as a member of Summit County Council and as Vice President of the Summit ESC Board of Governors, which helps provide important educational services to children throughout the community. For 16 years, Roemer has worked as a substitute teacher in the Revere School District, teaching students in upper level math and tutoring children as well.

Active in the local community, Roemer volunteered as president, treasurer and commissioner of Revere Baseball over the last 27 years. As manager of the high school travel program, his teams won four championships over a ten year period. Additionally, Roemer served on the executive committee of the Cuyahoga Valley Regional Council of Governments and the Akron General Hospital Member Advisory Committee.

Roemer has a Bachelor of Science degree in accounting from Case Western Reserve University, where he graduated summa cum laude. He also earned a Master of Business Administration degree from the Weatherhead School of Management of Case Western Reserve University. He is a former instructor of finance at Myers University.

Roemer is a retired AT&T sales director and a Certified Public Accountant, who previously worked in regulatory accounting.

Rep. Roemer is married to Josie Roemer, a member of Summit ESC, and resides in Richfield with his family.

References

Links 

 Representative Bill Roemer (official site)

Living people
Republican Party members of the Ohio House of Representatives
21st-century American politicians
1956 births
Case Western Reserve University alumni